Myrmeconauclea is a genus of flowering plants belonging to the family Rubiaceae.

Its native range is Malesia.

Species
Species:

Myrmeconauclea rheophila 
Myrmeconauclea stipulacea 
Myrmeconauclea strigosa 
Myrmeconauclea surianii

References

Rubiaceae
Rubiaceae genera